István Kovács (born 9 October 1973) is a retired Hungarian high jumper.

He competed at the 1997 World Indoor Championships without reaching the final round. He became Hungarian high jump champion in 1996 and 1997, as well as indoor champion in 1995 and 1997.

References

1973 births
Living people
Hungarian male high jumpers